The 2020 Tennessee Volunteers football team represented the University of Tennessee in the 2020 NCAA Division I FBS football season. The Volunteers played their home games at Neyland Stadium in Knoxville, Tennessee, and competed in the Eastern Division of the Southeastern Conference (SEC).

In a season initially questioned whether it would be played because of the COVID-19 pandemic, the Southeastern Conference ultimately decided to go through with the season, the Volunteers compiled a 3–7 record, all in conference games. While the team did not have a winning record, the NCAA had waived bowl eligibility requirement for the season, and Volunteers accepted a bid to the Liberty Bowl. However, the team had to withdraw on December 21 due to positive COVID-19 testing. They were led by third-year head coach Jeremy Pruitt, in what would turn out to be his final year. Pruitt would later be fired in January 2021 following an NCAA investigation for recruiting violations. He would leave Knoxville with a 16-19 overall record.

Previous season

Tennessee finished the 2019 regular season at 7–5 overall, 5–3 in the SEC, and were bowl eligible for the first time since 2016. On January 2, the Volunteers won the Gator Bowl over Indiana, 23–22, to finish at 8–5 for the season.

Preseason

SEC Media Days
In the preseason media poll, Tennessee was predicted to finish in third place in the East Division.

Schedule
Tennessee had games scheduled against Charlotte, Furman, Oklahoma, and Troy, which were all canceled due to the COVID-19 pandemic.

The SEC postponed Tennessee vs. Vanderbilt to facilitate the rescheduling of the Vanderbilt-Missouri game. The shuffling allows for the opportunity for all 14 SEC teams to play 10 regular-season games.

Tennessee accepted an invitation to play in the Auto Zone Liberty Bowl in Memphis, TN held on December 31, 2020, but was forced to withdraw due to Coach Pruitt and several players testing positive for COVID-19.

Game summaries

at South Carolina

Missouri

at #3 Georgia

Kentucky

#2 Alabama

at Arkansas

at #23 Auburn

#6 Florida

at Vanderbilt

Texas A&M

Rankings

Players drafted into the NFL

References

Tennessee
Tennessee Volunteers football seasons
Tennessee Volunteers football